In mathematics, arithmetico-geometric sequence is the result of term-by-term multiplication of a geometric progression with the corresponding terms of an arithmetic progression. Put plainly, the nth term of an arithmetico-geometric sequence is the product of the nth term of an arithmetic sequence
and the nth term of a geometric one. Arithmetico-geometric sequences arise in various applications, such as the computation of expected values in probability theory. For instance, the sequence

is an arithmetico-geometric sequence. The arithmetic component appears in the numerator (in blue), and the geometric one in the denominator (in green).

The summation of this infinite sequence is known as an arithmetico-geometric series, and its most basic form has been called Gabriel's staircase:

The denomination may also be applied to different objects presenting characteristics of both arithmetic and geometric sequences; for instance the French notion of arithmetico-geometric sequence refers to sequences of the form , which generalise both arithmetic and geometric sequences. Such sequences are a special case of linear difference equations.

Terms of the sequence
The first few terms of an arithmetico-geometric sequence composed of an arithmetic progression (in blue) with difference  and initial value  and a geometric progression (in green) with initial value  and common ratio 
are given by:

Example
For instance, the sequence

Sum of the terms 
The sum of the first  terms of an arithmetico-geometric sequence has the form

 

This sum has the closed-form expression

Proof
Multiplying,

where the last equality results of the expression for the sum of a geometric series. Finally dividing through by  gives the result.

Infinite series 
If −1 < r < 1, then the sum S of the arithmetico-geometric series, that is to say, the sum of all the infinitely many terms of the progression, is given by

If r is outside of the above range, the series either
 diverges (when r > 1, or when r = 1 where the series is arithmetic and a and d are not both zero; if both a and d are zero in the later case, all terms of the series are zero and the series is constant)
 or alternates (when r ≤ −1).

Example: application to expected values
For instance, the sum

,

This sequence corresponds to the expected number of coin tosses before obtaining "tails". The probability  of obtaining tails for the first time at the kth toss is as follows:

.

Therefore, the expected number of tosses is given by

 .

References

Further reading

Mathematical series